Gold Dust (c. 1873 – November 4, 1898) was a male Asian elephant that resided at the National Zoo in Washington, D.C. from April 30, 1891 until his death. He was indefinitely lent to the National Zoo as a companion for Dunk by the Adam Forepaugh Circus. He is also alleged to have disemboweled a man in Worcester, Massachusetts in 1884.

On November 3, 1898, Gold Dust collapsed while walking to Rock Creek with his companion Dunk. Even with Dunk's assistance, he was unable to rise and died the following morning. A postmortem examination revealed that his intestines were inflamed and his teeth were in bad shape and could not close properly.

See also
 List of individual elephants

References

External links
Smithsonian online catalog image of Gold Dust (left) and Dunk (right) taking a walk together

1873 animal births
1898 animal deaths
Individual elephants
Individual animals in the United States
Elephants in the United States